Softly, Softly may refer to:

 Softly, Softly (TV series), a 1966–1969 British police drama series
 Softly, Softly: Taskforce, a 1969–1976 revamped version of the series
 "Softly, Softly" (song), a 1955 popular song
 Softly-softly or potto, a West African primate
 Softly, Softly (film), a 1984 Italian film

See also
 Softly (disambiguation)
 Soft (disambiguation)